Clarence Crafoord  (1899 – 1984) was a Swedish cardiovascular surgeon, best known for  performing the first successful repair of aortic coarctation on 19 October 1944, one year before Robert E. Gross.
Crafoord also introduced heparin as thrombosis prophylaxis in the 1930s and he pioneered mechanical positive-pressure ventilation during thoracic operations in the 1940s.

Crafoord was professor of thoracic surgery at Karolinska Institutet from 1948 to 1966.

References

1899 births
1983 deaths
Swedish cardiac surgeons
Academic staff of the Karolinska Institute
20th-century Swedish physicians
History of surgery
20th-century surgeons